Masashi Kudo or Masashi Kudō may refer to:

, Japanese animator
, Japanese boxer